Chemical nomenclature, replete as it is with compounds with complex names, is a repository for some names that may be considered unusual. A browse through the Physical Constants of Organic Compounds in the CRC Handbook of Chemistry and Physics (a fundamental resource) will reveal not just the whimsical work of chemists, but the sometimes peculiar compound names that occur as the consequence of simple juxtaposition. Some names derive legitimately from their chemical makeup, from the geographic region where they may be found, the plant or animal species from which they are isolated or the name of the discoverer.

Some are given intentionally unusual trivial names based on their structure, a notable property or at the whim of those who first isolate them. However, many trivial names predate formal naming conventions. Trivial names can also be ambiguous or carry different meanings in different industries, geographic regions and languages.

Godly noted that "Trivial names having the status of INN or ISO are carefully tailor-made for their field of use and are internationally accepted". In his preface to Chemical Nomenclature, Thurlow wrote that "Chemical names do not have to be deadly serious". A website in existence since 1997 and maintained at the University of Bristol lists a selection of "molecules with silly or unusual names" strictly for entertainment. These so-called silly or funny trivial names (depending on culture) can also serve an educational purpose. In an article in the Journal of Chemical Education, Dennis Ryan argues that students of organic nomenclature (considered a "dry and boring" subject) may actually take an interest in it when tasked with the job of converting funny-sounding chemical trivial names to their proper systematic names.

The collection listed below presents a sample of trivial names and gives an idea how chemists are inspired when they coin a brand new name for a chemical compound outside of systematic naming. It also includes some examples of systematic names and acronyms that accidentally resemble English words.

Elements 

Glenn Seaborg told his students that he proposed the chemical symbol Pu (from P U)  instead of the conventional "Pl" for plutonium as a joke, only to find it officially adopted.
Unununium (Uuu) was the former temporary name of the chemical element number 111, a synthetic transuranium element. This element was named roentgenium (Rg) in November 2004.

Compounds

Name based on shape

Named after people

Named after fictional characters

Related to sex

Related to bodily functions

Related to death and decay

Related to religion or legend

Sounds like a name (person, brand or organization)

A part sounds like an English word

Other

See also

International Union of Pure and Applied Chemistry
IUPAC nomenclature
List of places with unusual names
List of unusual biological names
List of places used in the names of chemical elements

References

Bibliography 

 E.C. Alyea, "Metal Complexes of Ditertiary Arsines. Chapter in Transition Metal Complexes of Phosphorus, Arsenic and Antimony Ligands", MacMillan, 1973. Chapter: "Some amusing names of arsine ligands: edas, vdias, dam, ffars etc"
 J. Andraos, "Glossary of Coined Names & Terms Used in Science", York University, 2004.

Paul May, "Molecules with Silly or Unusual Names," Imperial College Press, July 2008, .

Alex Nickon and Ernest F. Silversmith, "Organic Chemistry, the Name Game: Modern Coined Terms and Their Origins", Pergamon 1987. .

Chemistry-related lists
Lists of names
Lists of things considered unusual